Cythara striata is a species of sea snail, a marine gastropod mollusk in the family Mangeliidae.

This species is considered a nomen dubium.

Description
The length of the shell varies between 15 mm and 20 mm.

The color of the shell is light yellowish brown, or yellowish white, banded narrowly and numerously with chestnut.

Distribution
This marine species occurs off the Philippines, the Moluccas and the Solomon Islands.

References

 Hemmen J. (2007) Recent Cancellariidae. Annotated and illustrated catalogue of Recent Cancellariidae. Privately published, Wiesbaden. 428 pp. [With amendments and corrections taken from Petit R.E. (2012) A critique of, and errata for, Recent Cancellariidae by Jens Hemmen, 2007. Conchologia Ingrata 9: 1–8

External links
  Tucker, J.K. 2004 Catalog of recent and fossil turrids (Mollusca: Gastropoda). Zootaxa 682: 1–1295.

striata